Chrome Children is a co-production between Stones Throw Records and Adult Swim. The CD & DVD set, released on October 3, 2006, includes songs from Oh No, J Dilla, Madlib, and other Stones Throw artists. It also includes footage from a hip-hop concert headlined by MF DOOM and Madlib on DVD. The concert was filmed by Adult Swim at the 2006 SXSW festival in Austin, TX.

A sequel, Chrome Children Vol. 2, was released in digital format January 29, 2007. The CD version was later released.

Track listing
 "Oh Zone"
 Performed by Oh No
 Produced by Oh No
 "Clap Your Hands"
 Performed by Guilty Simpson
 Produced by J Dilla
 "Take It Back"
 Performed by Madlib
 Produced by J Dilla
 "None In Mind"
 Performed by Koushik
 Produced by Koushik
 "Nothing Like This"
 Performed by J Dilla
 Produced by J Dilla
 "Do a Couple of Things"
 Performed by James Pants
 Produced by James Pants
 "Monkey Suite"
 Performed by MF Doom
 Produced by Madlib
 "Simply a Joy"
 Performed by Georgia Anne Muldrow
 Produced by Georgia Anne Muldrow
 "All I Know"
 Performed by M.E.D.
 Produced by Madlib
 "Wassup World?"
 Performed by Dudley Perkins
 Produced by JRose
 "Raw Heat"
 Performed by Percee P, Quasimoto
 Produced by Madlib
 "No $ No Toke (aka Blaze Up)"
 Performed by Jaylib
 Produced by Madlib
 "Drama"
 Performed by J. Rocc
 Produced by J. Rocc
 "Movin'"
 Performed by Roc C
 Produced by Oh No
 "Dreams"
 Performed by Gary Wilson
 Produced by Gary Wilson
 "Third Rock"
 Performed by Pure Essence
 Produced by Pure Essence
 "What Now"
 Performed by Aloe Blacc
 Produced by Aloe Blacc
 "Turned Around [PBW Remix]"
 Performed by Baron Zen
 Produced by Sweet Steve (Remixed By Peanut Butter Wolf)
 "Nino's Deed"
 Performed by Young Jazz Rebels
 Produced by Madlib

References

External links
 Official website: www.chromechildren.com
 Chrome Children at adultswim.com
 Chrome Children at www.stonesthrow.com

2006 compilation albums
2006 live albums
Adult Swim compilation albums
Adult Swim live albums
Adult Swim video albums
Live video albums
Stones Throw Records compilation albums
Stones Throw Records live albums
Stones Throw Records video albums
Hip hop compilation albums